Karl Schröder may refer to:

Karl Schröder I (1816–1890), German musician and father of Karl Schröder II
Karl Schröder II (1848–1935), musician and son of Karl Schröder I
Karl Schröder (German politician) (1884–1950), German politician and writer
Karl Schröder (canoeist), German slalom canoeist
Karl Ludwig Schröder (1877–1940), screenwriter, director and agent
 Karl Schröder (cinematographer) (1912–1996), German cinematographer

See also  
Karl Schroeder (born 1962), Canadian science fiction author